Parliamentary elections were held in Bulgaria on 5 October 2014 to elect the 43rd National Assembly. GERB remained the largest party, winning 84 of the 240 seats with around a third of the vote. A total of eight parties won seats, the first time since the beginning of democratic elections in 1990 that more than seven parties entered parliament. Boyko Borisov then became prime minister as head of a coalition with the Reformist Bloc and with outside support from the Patriotic Front and the Alternative for Bulgarian Revival.

Background
After the 2013 election, the seat distribution was such that the new coalition government, composed of the Bulgarian Socialist Party (BSP) and the Movement for Rights and Freedoms (DPS) and led by Plamen Oresharski, had only half the seats in Parliament, and thus prospects of holding early elections were significant. Also, the Oresharski cabinet was confronted by a series of protests starting on 14 June 2013, in response to the election of Delyan Peevski as head of the Bulgarian state security agency DANS (State Agency for National Security).

Following the setback suffered by the BSP in the European Parliament election - having picked up 18.94% of the popular vote (down from 26.6% in 2013) - opposition parties called for early parliamentary elections. The leader of the DPS expressed his desire to have the government resign so that early elections can be scheduled for the end of 2014 or the middle of 2015.

On 10 June 2014 the leader of the Bulgarian Socialist Party, Sergei Stanishev, demanded the resignation of the government: "We cannot have the responsibility for the existence and actions of this government solely by ourselves." Following an agreement from the three largest parties (GERB, BSP and DPS) to hold early parliamentary elections for 5 October 2014, the cabinet was to resign by the end of July.

On Wednesday July 23, Oresharski's government submitted its resignation. The next day parliament voted 180–8 (8 abstained and 44 were absent) to accept the government's resignation. After each party refused to try to form a new government, on 6 August a caretaker government led by Georgi Bliznashki was sworn into office and the 42nd National Assembly was dissolved with an election date set for 5 October.

Campaign
Twenty-two parties and seven coalitions registered to run on election day before the deadline. Two parties were denied registration.

The election campaign started on 5 September.

Opinion polls

Pre election campaign

Election campaign

Results

Voter demographics
Gallup exit polling suggested the following demographic breakdown. The parties which received below 4% of the vote are included in 'Others':

Reactions
Following his party's election victory, Borisov stated that his party would try to form the next government and that he "want[s] to govern, in person".

Government formation

The newly elected Assembly met for the first time on 27 October.

After being tasked by President Rosen Plevneliev to form a government, Borisov's GERB allied with the Reformist Bloc to form a government and also had the outside support of the Patriotic Front and the Alternative for Bulgarian Revival. The cabinet of twenty ministers was approved by a majority of 136-97 (with one abstention). Borisov was then chosen as prime minister by an even larger vote of 149-85.

References

Bulgaria
Parliamentary
Parliamentary elections in Bulgaria